The Lake County Captains are a Minor League Baseball team in Eastlake, Ohio, a suburb of Cleveland, that plays in the Midwest League as the High-A affiliate of the Cleveland Guardians.

The Captains joined the Class A Midwest League following the 2009 season in a shuffle caused by the Columbus Catfish's move to Bowling Green, Kentucky, for the 2009 season. The move alleviated travel costs and time, as it was the South Atlantic League's northernmost team.

Prior to the 2003 season, the club was based in Columbus, Georgia, and known as the Columbus RedStixx. The Captains play their home games in Classic Park, which has a capacity of 6,157 and opened in 2003 as Eastlake Stadium. The current stadium name is the result of a naming rights arrangement; the sponsor is Classic Automotive Group, a major area chain of auto dealerships. Classic Park hosted the South Atlantic League All-Star Game on June 20, 2006.

Franchise regular season win–loss records

Columbus Indians (73–69)
1991: 73–69
Columbus RedStixx (823–711)
1992: 77–62 (1st Half Southern Division Champions – SAL)
1993: 86–56
1994: 87–51 (1st Half Southern Division Champions – SAL)
1995: 80–62 (2nd Half Southern Division Champions – SAL)
1996: 79–63 (2nd Half Southern Division Champions – SAL)
1997: 62–76
1998: 59–81
1999: 70–71 (1st Half Southern Division Champions – SAL)
2000: 67–70 (1st Half Southern Division Champions – SAL)
2001: 77–59
2002: 79–60 (2nd Half Southern Division Champions – SAL)
Lake County Captains (853–810 entering 2016)
2003: 97–43 (1st & 2nd Half Northern Division Champions – SAL) (Best regular season record in pro baseball in 2003, min 120 games)
2004: 73–66
2005: 72–66
2006: 64–74
2007: 64–74
2008: 75–65 (1st Half Northern Division Champions – SAL)
2009: 71–66
2010: 77–62 (1st Half Eastern Division Champions – MWL & Midwest League Champions)
2011: 53–86
2012: 71–68 (2nd Half; Clinched MWL Wild Card - Lost in Semifinal Round)
2013: 54–83
2014: 65–74 (2nd Half; Clinched MWL Wild Card - Lost in Championship Round)
2015: 71–66
2016: 72–68
2017: 54–85
2018: 60–79
2019: 74–64 (1st Half; Clinched MWL Wild Card - Lost in Quarterfinal Round)
2020: Season Suspended due to Covid-19 Pandemic
2021: 65-55

Franchise records
Win–loss record entering 2017: 1821-1658 (979–961 as the Lake County Captains)
Longest winning streak: 13 games (May 27 – June 8, 2003)
Longest losing streak: 10 games (June 8–18, 2011) & (April 10–19, 2012)
Pitcher with most wins in a season: Steve Kline, 18 in 1994 (also league leader that year)
Hitter with most home runs in a season: Russell Branyan, 40 in 1996 (also league leader that year)

Playoffs (since 2005)
2008: Lost to West Virginia 2-1 in semifinals
2010: Defeated West Michigan 2-1 in quarterfinals; Defeated Great Lakes 2-1 in semifinals
2012: Defeated Bowling Green 2–0 in quarterfinals; lost to Fort Wayne 2-0 in semifinals
2014: Defeated South Bend 2–0 in quarterfinals; defeated Fort Wayne 2–0 in semifinals; lost to Kane County 3–0 in finals
2019: Lost to Great Lakes 2-1 in quarterfinals

Roster

Notable franchise alumni

 Chris Archer (2007-2009) 2x MLB All-Star

 David Bell (1991)

 Russell Branyan (1995-1996)

 Roberto Hernandez (2003, 2008-2009, 2012) MLB All-Star

 Einar Diaz (1993-1994)

 Alan Embree (1991)

 Maicer Izturis (1999-2000)

 Steve Kline (1994)

 Ted Kubiak (2010-2011, MGR) 

 Tim Laker (2002)

 Francisco Lindor (2012) 2x MLB All-Star

Albie Lopez (1992)

Torey Lovullo (2002, MGR) 2017 NL Manager of the Year

Víctor Martínez (2000) 5x MLB All-Star

 Dave Mlicki (1991)

Eli Morgan (2018)

 Jhonny Peralta (2000) 3x MLB All-Star
Scott Radinsky (2005, coach) 

 Jose Ramirez (2012) MLB All-Star

CC Sabathia (1999) 6x MLB All-Star; 2007 AL Cy Young Award

 Danny Salazar (2009-2010) MLB All-Star

 Marco Scutaro (1996) MLB All-Star

 Richie Sexson (1994) 2x MLB All-Star

 Kelly Stinnett (1991) 

 Eric Wedge (1998, MGR) 2007 AL Manager of the Year

 Jaret Wright (1995)

 Steven Wright (2007, 2011) MLB All-Star

Captains Call-Up Club

The names of all Captains players and franchise alumni who have advanced to play Major League Baseball are all enshrined in the Lake County Captains Call-Up Club at Classic Park. The Call-Up Club also includes former Captains coaches and managers who've made it to Major League Baseball coaching staffs as well. A new wall of bronze plaques was installed at the main entrance of Classic Park in August of the 2017 season. The previous "Walk of Fame" started in the outfield of Classic Park and was moved to an interior wall of the ballpark near the right field corner of the stadium.

References

External links

 
 Statistics from Baseball-Reference

Baseball teams established in 2003
Midwest League teams
Defunct South Atlantic League teams
Cleveland Guardians minor league affiliates
Lake County, Ohio
Baseball teams in Cleveland
Professional baseball teams in Ohio
2003 establishments in Ohio
High-A Central teams